CDG Express is a planned railway line between Gare de l'Est in Paris and Charles de Gaulle Airport to alleviate the saturation of the RER B line. , it is scheduled to open in early 2027. and, when operational, it will take no more than 20 minutes to travel the 32-kilometre distance, for a fare of €24.

History
In June 2000 SNCF, Réseau Ferré de France and Aéroports de Paris formed CDG-Express, a groupement d'intérêt économique, to develop a high-speed rail link from Paris to Charles de Gaulle Airport. It was proposed to open in 2006.

In July 2008 a consortium of Vinci, Caisse des dépôts et consignations, Axa and Keolis was selected to finance, build and manage the line with a scheduled 2013 opening. However the project stalled, until it was relaunched in January 2014.

It will be built and operated by a 50:50 joint venture between SNCF and Paris Aéroport. Hello Paris, a Keolis and RATP Group joint venture, will operate the line for 15 years from January 2024 with a fleet of Alstom Coradia Liners.

On 29 May 2019, transport minister Élisabeth Borne announced the CDG Express would be delayed to late 2025, after the 2024 Summer Olympics, in order to focus on other infrastructure works in the northern suburbs of Paris.

Commissioning with opening to the public is scheduled for the first quarter of 2027.

References

External links
 

Airport rail links
Charles de Gaulle Airport
Keolis
Proposed railway lines in France

RATP Group

2024 in rail transport